Purr Pals is a pet simulation game by American studio Brain Toys in which the player takes care of a kitten. It is Crave Entertainment's answer to Nintendo's Nintendogs and is sponsored by Purina.

Reception

The game holds a 67 rating on review site Metacritic based on 4 reviews for the DS version.

IGN rated the game a 6.5 of 10 saying There's one last reason the title can't score higher than it does, though, and it's not the too-frequent need to feed mentioned above – it's game-ending crashes. PALGN rated the game a  7 of 10 saying "Purr Pals is a great alternative to Nintendogs and is a game that is a lot of fun for kitten lovers".

Jinny Gudmundsen from The Star Press rated the game a 2.5 of 5 saying "Video game offers cute but flawed simulation for cat lovers".

The highest-rated review comes from Nintendo Gamer who rated the game a 77 of 100 saying "Not entirely convincing, and far less smooth than Nintendo's unnamed dog-related game. But it's well put-together feline fun with minigames".

See also
Baby Pals
Catz DS

References

2007 video games
Crave Entertainment games
Nintendo DS games
Wii games
Multiplayer and single-player video games
Video games about cats
Video games developed in the United States
Virtual pet video games